The River House Ghost is a 1932 British comedy crime film directed by Frank Richardson and starring Florence Desmond, Hal Walters and Joan Marion. It was shot at Teddington Studios by Warner Bros. for release as a quota quickie.

Premise
A gang of criminals masquerading as ghosts are eventually exposed.

Cast
 Florence Desmond as Flo
 Hal Walters as Walter
 Joan Marion as Sally
 Mike Johnson as Johnson
 Shayle Gardner as Skeleton
 Earle Stanley as Black Mask
 Helen Ferrers as Martha Usher

References

Bibliography
 Chibnall, Steve. Quota Quickies: The Birth of the British 'B' Film. British Film Institute, 2007.
 Low, Rachael. Filmmaking in 1930s Britain. George Allen & Unwin, 1985.
 Wood, Linda. British Films, 1927-1939. British Film Institute, 1986.

External links

1932 films
1930s crime comedy films
Films directed by Frank Richardson
British crime comedy films
British black-and-white films
1932 comedy films
1930s English-language films
1930s British films
Quota quickies
Films shot at Teddington Studios
Warner Bros. films